The badminton men's team tournament at the 2010 Asian Games in Guangzhou took place from 13 November to 15 November at Tianhe Gymnasium.

The final of the 2010 Guangzhou Asian Games on 15 November was a repeat of the Doha Asian Games, with the South Korea men's team meeting China. In the end, China defeated their Korean rivals and gained their second Asian Games men's title. Indonesia and Thailand shared the bronze medal.

The first bout of the contest, the men's singles, was taken by Lin Dan. In the next bout, the men's doubles, Korea's Lee Yong-dae / Jung Jae-sung beat Cai Yun / Fu Haifeng, ranked seventh in the world, 21–17, 20–22, 24–22, to regain ground for Korea. In the next bout, Yoo Yeon-seong / Ko Sung-hyun fought against the Chinese team, but they were unable to carry the momentum of the counterattack and were beaten back. Korea's 1–3 was no match for the Chinese team in the end, with the second consecutive Asian Games silver for Korea.

Schedule
All times are China Standard Time (UTC+08:00)

Results

Round of 16

Quarterfinals

Semifinals

Final

Non-participating athletes

References 
 Bracket
Asian Games Complete Results

External links 
 Official site

Badminton at the 2010 Asian Games